Claire Luchette is an American author. They published their first novel, Agatha of Little Neon, in 2021, a book featuring Sisters of the Catholic church. Luchette was honored with a "5 under 35" designation by the National Book Foundation in 2021 and was a 2020 National Endowment for the Arts Fellow. Before publishing their first novel, Luchette's short story “New Bees” won a 2020 Pushcart Prize.

Luchette attended Brown University as an undergraduate where they studied English. Later, Luchette received a Master of Fine Arts degree from the University of Oregon. They are a Chicago native and currently live in Ohio where they are the inaugural Post-Graduate Hopkins Fellow in the Department of English at John Carroll University.

Published works

Novels

References 

Year of birth missing (living people)
Brown University alumni
University of Oregon alumni
Living people
21st-century American novelists
21st-century American women writers